Roger Crogge was an English politician who was MP for Lyme Regis in 1393, 1399, 1402, 1406, May 1413, and November 1414. He was also reeve of Colyford from 1422 to 1423 and mayor of Lyme Regis 1437.

References

English MPs 1393
English MPs 1399
English MPs 1402
English MPs 1406
English MPs May 1413
English MPs November 1414
Members of the Parliament of England (pre-1707) for Lyme Regis
Mayors of places in Dorset
Reeves (England)
14th-century births
15th-century deaths